The 1979 Temple Owls football team was an American football team that represented Temple University as an independent during the 1979 NCAA Division I-A football season. In its 10th season under head coach Wayne Hardin, the team compiled a 10–2 record, defeated California in the 1979 Garden State Bowl, outscored all opponents by a total of 399 to 198, and was ranked No. 17 in the final AP and Coaches polls. The team played its home games at Veterans Stadium in Philadelphia. 

The team's statistical leaders included Brian Broomell with 2,103 passing yards, Mark Bright with 1,036 rushing yards, and Gerald Lucear with 964 receiving yards and 78 points scored.

Schedule

Roster

References

Temple
Temple Owls football seasons
Temple Owls football